Conny Kissling  (born 18 July 1961) is a Swiss freestyle skier, world champion and Olympic participant. 

She competed at the 1992 Winter Olympics in Albertville, in women's moguls. Her achievements at the FIS Freestyle World Ski Championships include one gold  medal in combined in 1986, and three silver medals.

Kissling is married to Swiss alpine skier and sports official Urs Lehmann.

References

External links 
 

1961 births
Living people
Swiss female freestyle skiers
Olympic freestyle skiers of Switzerland
Freestyle skiers at the 1992 Winter Olympics
20th-century Swiss women